Meerhout is a municipality located in the Belgian province of Antwerp. The municipality only comprises the town of Meerhout proper. In 2021, Meerhout had a total population of 10,279. The total area is 36.29 km² which gives a population density of 264 inhabitants per km². In Meerhout some famous people have lived, like Kate Ryan (well known in France and Belgium, The UK, Turkey, Spain and the rest of western Europe).

Meerhout is a part of the Economic Network of the Albertkanaal (Albert Canal, named after King Albert 1).

Demographics
As of 1 January 2008, there are 9578 people living in Meerhout. 50.4% of them are men, 49.6% are women. Most people are older than 40.

Tourism
There is quite a lot of tourism in Meerhout. Tourist routes include the "drieprovincieënroute" (three provinces route), which is a cycling route going through the provinces of Antwerp, Flemish Brabant and Limburg. There are also some B&Bs available, and most shopkeepers understand English. Meerhout is popular among people from the Netherlands, Germany and Ireland. Some (older) English people visit Meerhout too because of "The Wing" and other memorial icons of WW2.
Every year, around the last week-end of April, around 30,000 people travel to Meerhout to go to Groezrock, one of the world's largest punk rock festivals.

Education
There are only 5 schools in Meerhout, these schools are both Pre- and Primary schools for children between the age of 3 and 12 years old.

There are secondary schools in the neighbourhood which are easily reachable by public transport or car/bicycle, in Geel, Mol, Diest and Tessenderlo.

Sports

A cyclo-cross competition is held in October.

Media
Meerhout had its own radio station, "MeerGoud" (MeerHout=>Meergoud, Goud means "Gold"), but it ceased broadcasting in 2006.

Notable inhabitants
Kate Ryan (Female artist, won several awards, also well known in France, and getting more famous in other countries all over Europe)

References

External links

Official website (Dutch only)

Municipalities of Antwerp Province
Populated places in Antwerp Province